Anneli Giske (born 25 July 1985) is a Norwegian international footballer who plays club football for IF Fløya of the Norwegian 1. divisjon.

Club career
Giske won the 2003 Norwegian Women's Cup with Medkila IL, who were also promoted to the Topppserien. When Medkila suffered relegation after one season, Giske transferred to IF Fløya. She played for the club while studying for a degree in medicine at the University of Tromsø.

After an ankle injury early in 2010 followed by a broken toe and an anterior cruciate ligament injury Giske underwent knee surgery in October 2010  and hoped to return to playing for Fløya (now in division-1) in 2012.  Meanwhile, (April 2012) she is Fløya's assistant trainer while working her 18-month period of compulsory training as a junior doctor which began in February 2012.

After the 2013 season, Giske claimed she was quitting Fløya after suffering further injuries and failing to recapture her earlier form. But when the new season came round Giske was still in the team.

International career
In October 2008 Giske made her senior international debut for Norway against Russia. She was selected for UEFA Women's Euro 2009, and scored the second goal in Norway's 3–1 quarter final win over Sweden. Giske had been named an alternate for the 2008 Olympics.

References

External links 
 

1985 births
Living people
Norwegian women's footballers
Norway women's international footballers
Toppserien players
IF Fløya players
Medkila IL (women) players
21st-century Norwegian physicians
Women's association football midfielders